A pump boat (usually variation as pambot in local languages) is an outrigger canoe powered by a small gasoline or diesel engine. Smaller pump boats might be powered by the sort of small single-cylinder engine used to drive a water pump. Larger ones are often powered by recycled automobile engines.

Pump boats are a utility boat in the Philippines, used for nearly everything from inter-island transportation to fishing and even the Philippine Coast Guard. Pump boats are also used by Sama-Bajau migrants and refugees in Sabah, Malaysia and eastern Indonesia (where it is known as pombot).

See also
 Paraw
 Basnigan
 Lepa (ship)
 Balangay
 Traditional fishing boat
 List of boat types

References

Canoes
Water transportation in the Philippines
Passenger ships of the Philippines
Types of fishing vessels
Indigenous boats